Shelley is a partly rural village and partly residential conurbation in the Ongar civil parish of the Epping Forest district of Essex, England.

The former civil parish of Shelley focused on the parish church and the manor house of Shelley Hall at the north of the parish, and was bounded at the north by the civil parish of Moreton, the south by the A414 Harlow to Chelmsford Road, the east by the B184 road from Chipping Ongar to Great Dunmow, and the west by the southeast-to-northwest Moreton Road which edges Shelley Common with its Roding tributary of Cripsey Brook.

History
In the Domesday Book, Shelley is listed as "Senleia". Shelley manor was of 13 households, with five villagers, five smallholders, and three slaves, and included one lord's plough team and two men's plough teams. Before the Conquest, lordship was held by Leofday, under the overlordship of Esger the Constable; after which in 1086 the manor was given to Reginald, under Geoffrey de Mandeville who was Tenant-in-chief to William the Conqueror.

Shelley was described in 1848 as "a small parish of scattered houses, between the river Roding and Cripsey Brook, 1½ miles north from Chipping Ongar". Of Elizabethan style, it was extensively restored in 1869. Shelley Hall is today a Grade II* listed gabled, timber framed and brick clad house dating to the 14th century with 16th- to 18th-century structural additions and internal fittings. By 1848, the former mansion of Bundish Hall, 1⁄2 mile (800 m) north from the church, had been reduced to a moated farmhouse, and is today partly within Moreton parish. The church in 1848, built in 1811 on the site of a decayed and unused former church, consisted of a small nave, a brick chancel and a western wooden turret with one bell. The parish rectory, near the hall but no longer existing, was described as "an ancient timber-framed building", and was where Thomas Newton (1704–1782), subsequently the Bishop of Bristol from 1761 to his death, wrote his Dissertations on the Prophecies, which he completed in 1758. The house was burnt down when unoccupied in 1937.

Within the church was noted a memorial of inscribed brass with effigy to John Green, who died in 1626, aged 89, and his wife, and sixteen children of whom seven were boys. The children left the manor but produced 111 grandchildren during the life of John Green and his wife. The parish registers date to 1689 for baptisms, 1687 for burials, and 1709 for marriages. Two parish charities were those of Harvey Kimpton who was Lord of the Manor until his death in 1817, and of William Bullock in 1822. The Kimpton charity of £110.5s.2d. gave a three per cent dividend per year, as did the Bullock charity from a bank annuity of £333.6s.8d. Both charities provided for the relief of parish poor, with Bullock's being distributed by the rector on Christmas Day in the form of beef, bread and coal to those of good character. The rector was also responsible for the upkeep of Shelly Bridge over Cripsey Brook on Moreton Road to the south-west of the church.

Shelley parish was in the Ongar Union – poor relief provision set up under the Poor Law Amendment Act 1834 – and in the Ongar Rural Deanery, of the Essex Archdeaconry of the Diocese of St Albans. In 1888 St Peter's Church was entirely rebuilt on same site in Early English style with flint and Bath stone. The new, and existing, church has a nave of three bays, a north aisle, a vestry and an organ chamber. The tower, with shingle broach spire, and containing two bells dating to 1810, is built at the north west corner of the church, the base of the tower forming the north facing porch. During digging the foundations for new church, two tombstones, dated 1652 and 1765, were discovered and were built into the west wall of the porch. The present church is Grade II listed. During at least the last half of the 19th and into the 20th century, children at Shelley were entitled to attend school at Chipping Ongar. Attached to Shelley Hall was a room which housed the parish Sunday School, which in 1894 was being taught by the occupant of the Hall and the daughters of the rector. In 1818 education for the poor had been provided by a Sunday School in Ongar and a nearby day school, paid for through a subscription from the rector. The rector's later Sunday School at Shelley, begun in 1828, was attended by nine males and eight females.

Crops grown in the parish were chiefly wheat, barley, beans, clover, and roots (typically root vegetables such as turnips), these on a soil of marl over a clay subsoil. Shelley parish population in 1818 was 175; in 1833 was 163; in 1841 was 209; in 1881 was 200; in 1891 and 1901 was 186; in 1911 was 232, and in 1931 was 386.

Trade directory parish occupations in 1848 listed five farmers, a beer seller, and a plumber. By 1863 there were four farmers, one of whom was a cattle dealer, a tailor, two shoemakers, one of whom ran a beer house, and a 'traveller' (possibly a hawker). In 1874 there were four farmers, presuming one to be at Shelley Hall, and a new listing for the licensee of the Red Cow public house, who remained listed until at least 1914. By 1882 the number of farmers was reduced to three, and by 1914, to two. At Shelley Hall a mechanical engineer was listed for 1882. New occupations by 1914 were two accountants and a dressmaker. From 1863 to 1882 an establishment variously listed as a ladies' boarding school and ladies' academy was present at Shelley House, a building at the south on today's crossroads of the A414 and B184. This Georgian-facaded house with later 19th- and early 20th-century additions, probably dated to the late 17th century, but today is non-existent.

Until the Second World War Shelley was chiefly a rural parish. However, a small program of council house and prefabricated bungalow building was started before the War on Moreton Road at the south by the then Ongar Rural District Council, which, between 1945 and 1953, planned and developed further housing infill of the southern part of Shelley, between Moreton Road and the A414, of approximately 450 houses, with shops, a community hall and Shelley primary school.

In 1965 Shelley civil parish was abolished and absorbed, with Chipping Ongar, Marden Ash and Greensted, into the new Ongar civil parish, governed by its own Ongar Town Council. In 1974 Ongar civil parish with its town council, which was previously within Epping and Ongar Rural District, was transferred to the new Epping Forest District of Essex.

In 2013 a planning application was presented to Epping Forest District Council and Ongar Town Council by Fyfield Joint Venture, an organization based within Fyfield Business and Research Park which is privately operated by the real estate company Fyfield Business And Research Park Ltd. The proposal was to develop the Park with the addition of 105 homes and shops, an enlarged café, recreational facilities,  of new retail space, increased parking, and a new access roundabout, partly on the green belt. Ongar Town Council wrote to Eric Pickles, the then Secretary of State for Housing, Communities and Local Government, over lack of public consultation and safety concerns. A revised plan was presented by Fyfield Joint Venture in 2015.

Community
Shelley is in the Shelley Ward of the Ongar civil parish, under the local authority of Ongar Town Council.

Services and businesses in Shelley include the Fyfield Business and Research Park, The Ongar Academy secondary school, Ongar Leisure Centre, Ongar War Memorial Medical Centre, a branch of Comitti of London clockmakers, and a BP fuel service station, all on the B184 road. Ongar Primary School is adjacent to the A414 in the post-war housing development.

Fyfield Business and Research Park,  to the east of St Peter's Church, provides  and 25 units of laboratory, office, workshop, retail and services space. The Park includes a drug development laboratory, a building design consultancy company, an audio-visual & lighting company, building contractors' and surveyors' companies, an oil and gas extraction company, various design and consultancy firms, an E-commerce clothing shop, an Indian food takeaway, a private day nursery, and a screen printing company.

Other smaller services and shops in Shelley include further takeaways for kebab & pizza and fish & chips, a seafood restaurant, a hair salon, and two small convenience stores (one a Nisa).

Education
In 1936, Essex County Council had established the Ongar County Secondary School in a neo-Georgian building fronting Fyfield Road, Shelley. The school expanded in the 1960s when it became Ongar Comprehensive School, but was closed in 1989. Its buildings were demolished to make way for a new residential development and new youth and adult education centres. Ongar Leisure Centre, a joint use sporting facility, was retained. Secondary school children were then bussed to schools in the surrounding towns, particularly Brentwood and Shenfield. Twenty six years later in September 2015, a new secondary education school called The Ongar Academy, with no historic association to any previous Ongar school apart from being built on part of the site of the earlier Ongar County Secondary School in Shelley, opened adjacent to Ongar Leisure Centre on Fyfield Road.

References

External links

"Shelley: Church", in A History of the County of Essex, vol 4, Ongar Hundred, ed. W R Powell (London, 1956), pp. 206–208. British History Online. Retrieved 1 March 2018.
Ongar Primary School in Shelley. Retrieved 2 March 2018
The Ongar Academy secondary school in Shelley. Retrieved 2 March 2018

Villages in Essex
Former civil parishes in Essex
Epping Forest District